Rafael J. Salvia (1915 – 21 June 1976) was a Spanish screenwriter and film director. He wrote for 81 films between 1950 and 1976. He also directed 21 films between 1953 and 1973.

Selected filmography

 The King's Mail (1951)
 Concierto mágico (1953) 
 Flight 971 (1953)
 Las chicas de la Cruz Roja (1958)
 Carnival Day (1960)
 Atraco a las tres (1962)
 La gran familia (1962)
 La cesta (1965)
 Cristina Guzmán (1968)
 A Decent Adultery  (1969)
 The Complete Idiot (1970)
 The Locket (1970)
 The Man Who Wanted to Kill Himself (1970)
 Una chica casi decente (1971)
 The Doubt (1972)
 The Guerrilla (1973)
 Death's Newlyweds (1975)
 The Legion Like Women (1976)

External links

1915 births
1976 deaths
People from Tortosa
Spanish male writers
Male screenwriters
Spanish film directors
20th-century Spanish screenwriters
20th-century Spanish male writers